Hamad Bader is a Bahraini swimmer. He competed in the men's 100 metre freestyle at the 1984 Summer Olympics.

References

Year of birth missing (living people)
Living people
Bahraini male swimmers
Olympic swimmers of Bahrain
Swimmers at the 1984 Summer Olympics
Place of birth missing (living people)